Past Progressive is the debut English-language studio album by Chinese Singer Jane Zhang. It was produced by Timbaland, King Logan, Harvey Mason Jr. and released on April 27, 2019 on Jane Zhang Studio. the album's first single, "Dust My Shoulders Off," was released on October 14, 2016. This single became the advertising song of the US media HULU. With the spread of the song, some American musicians paid attention to Jane Zhang. so, Jane successfully invited Migos to produce a remixed version of the album's second single, "Work for It".

Background 
In 2011, Jane Zhang wanted to launch an English album. In 2014, Timbaland began working with Jane Zhang on this English album.

Accolades

Track listing
Track listing and credits adapted from Apple Music .

Charts

References 

2019 albums
Jane Zhang albums